Fabio Rampelli (born 2 August 1960) is an Italian politician.

Biography
Rampelli graduated in Architecture at the University of Rome "La Sapienza" and worked as an architect. He was also a member of the Italy national swimming team in 1978.

In his youth, he joined the Roman Youth section of the Italian Social Movement and in 1989, together with Gianni Alemanno, he was arrested for protests in Nettuno for the arrival of George H. W. Bush. 

He served as municipal councilor of Rome from 1993 to 1997 and as regional councilor of Lazio from 1995 to 2005. In 2005 he was elected for the first time to the Chamber of Deputies with National Alliance. He joined later The People of Freedom and subsequently, in 2012, he followed Giorgia Meloni into Brothers of Italy.

He has been chairman of the FdI's parliamentary group from 2014 to 2018, when he has been elected Vice-President of the Chamber of Deputies.

References

1960 births
Politicians from Rome
Brothers of Italy politicians
The People of Freedom politicians
National Alliance (Italy) politicians
Italian Social Movement politicians
Deputies of Legislature XIV of Italy
Deputies of Legislature XV of Italy
Deputies of Legislature XVI of Italy
Deputies of Legislature XVII of Italy
Deputies of Legislature XVIII of Italy
Living people
Italian male swimmers
Sapienza University of Rome alumni
Architects from Rome
Vice presidents of the Chamber of Deputies (Italy)